Thor Sørheim (born 1 February 1949) is a Norwegian author and 1986 recipient of the Olav Dalgards Prize.

References

Norwegian male writers
1949 births
Living people
Place of birth missing (living people)